Santec is a commune in the Finistère department of Brittany in north-western France.

Population
Inhabitants of Santec are called in French Santecois.

Sights

See also
Communes of the Finistère department

References

External links

Official website 

Mayors of Finistère Association 

Communes of Finistère
Populated coastal places in France